The men's team pursuit in the 2009–10 ISU Speed Skating World Cup was contested over four races on four occasions, out of a total of seven World Cup occasions for the season, with the first occasion involving the event taking place in Heerenveen, Netherlands, on 13–15 November 2009, and the last occasion also taking place in Heerenveen, on 12–14 March 2010.

Norway won the cup, while the Netherlands came second, and Canada, the defending champions, came third.

Top three

Race medallists

Final standings
Standings as of 14 March 2010 (end of the season).

References

Men team pursuit